Benedetto Lorenzelli (11 May 1853 – 15 September 1915) was an Italian Cardinal of the Roman Catholic Church who served as Prefect of the Sacred Congregation of Studies from 1914 until his death, and was elevated to the cardinalate in 1907.

Biography
Benedetto Lorenzelli was born in Castel di Casio, and studied at the seminary in Bologna and the Pontifical Roman Athenaeum S. Apollinare in Rome, from where he obtained his doctorates in philosophy, theology, and civil and canon law. Lorenzelli was ordained to the priesthood on 1 April 1876, and then taught philosophy at the Pontifical Urban University in Rome until 1884.

He was Professor of dogmatic theology at the Pontifical Roman Athenaeum "S. Apollinare" from 1884 to 1889, whilst serving as the first Rector of the Pontifical Bohemian College. After being named as member of the Pontifical Academy "S. Tommaso", Lorenzelli served as an ablegatus to Vienna on 3 April 1884 and later received an honorary doctorate in philosophy from the University of Laval in Canada. He was raised to the rank of Privy Chamberlain of His Holiness in 1889, and became an attaché in the nunciature to Austria on 3 April that year. On 18 June 1890 he entered the Roman Curia as a referendary prelate of the Supreme Tribunal of the Apostolic Signature. He was made Internuncio to the Netherlands and Luxembourg on 30 May 1893 and a protonotary apostolic on 10 June 1893.

On 1 October 1896 Lorenzelli was appointed Apostolic Nuncio to Bavaria, and later Titular Archbishop of Sardes on 30 November by Pope Leo XIII. He received his episcopal consecration on the following 8 December from Cardinal Mariano Rampolla, with Archbishops Ernesto Respighi and Lorenzo Passerini serving as co-consecrators, in the church of the Oblates in Tor de' Specchi. Lorenzelli was Nuncio to France from 10 May 1899 to 31 July 1904, when diplomatic relations between the Vatican and France were terminated. On 14 November 1904 he was named Archbishop of Lucca.

Pope Pius X created him Cardinal Priest of Santa Croce in Gerusalemme in the consistory of 15 April 1907. Lorenzelli, following a period of five years, resigned as Archbishop on 26 March 1910 and was appointed Prefect of the Sacred Congregation of Studies on 13 February 1914. He was one of the cardinal electors who participated in the 1914 papal conclave, which selected Pope Benedict XV. Lorenzelli was also one of the three Cardinal-Presidents of the Pontifical Academy "S. Tommaso", together with Louis Billot, SJ, and Michele Lega.

The Cardinal died in Bucciano, at the age of 62, and is buried there.

References

External links
Cardinals of the Holy Roman Church
Catholic-Hierarchy 

1853 births
1915 deaths
20th-century Italian cardinals
Apostolic Nuncios to Bavaria
Apostolic Nuncios to France
Apostolic Nuncios to Belgium
20th-century Italian Roman Catholic titular archbishops
20th-century Italian Roman Catholic archbishops
Cardinals created by Pope Pius X